Johnny Lee O'Bryant III (born June 1, 1993) is an American professional basketball player for the Shanghai Sharks of the Chinese Basketball Association (CBA). He played college basketball for Louisiana State University.

High school career
Considered a four-star recruit by ESPN.com, O'Bryant was listed as the No. 7 power forward and the No. 46 player in the nation in 2011.

College career
In his three-year college career at Louisiana State University, O'Bryant was one of just 14 LSU players to record 1,000 career points and 700 career rebounds. He was also a two-time first-team All-SEC honoree.

On April 1, 2014, he declared for the NBA draft, foregoing his final year of college eligibility.

Professional career

Milwaukee Bucks (2014–2016)
On June 26, 2014, O'Bryant was selected with the 36th overall pick in the 2014 NBA draft by the Milwaukee Bucks. On July 30, 2014, he signed with the Bucks after averaging 8.2 points in five Summer League games for the team. On October 9, he suffered a grade III sprain of the medial collateral ligament (MCL) in his right knee. The injury ruled him out of the first 25 games of the season, as he made his debut for the Bucks on December 17. On December 26, he scored a season-high 12 points in a 107–77 win over the Atlanta Hawks.

On November 11, 2015, O'Bryant had a season-best game with 11 points and 9 rebounds in a loss to the Denver Nuggets.

On June 29, 2016, O'Bryant was waived by the Bucks.

On September 23, 2016, O'Bryant signed with the Washington Wizards, but was later waived on October 21 after appearing in four preseason games.

Northern Arizona Suns (2016–2017)
On November 11, 2016, O'Bryant was acquired by the Northern Arizona Suns of the NBA Development League. He made his debut for the Suns in the team's season opener the following day, recording 18 points and 12 rebounds in a 122–106 win over the Iowa Energy. On January 16, 2017, he was named NBA Development League Performer of the Week for games played Monday, January 9 through Sunday, January 15.

Denver Nuggets (2017) 
On January 26, 2017, O'Bryant signed a 10-day contract with the Denver Nuggets. On February 6, 2017, he signed a second 10-day contract with the Nuggets.

Return to Northern Arizona (2017) 
O'Bryant returned to the Northern Arizona Suns on February 16 following the expiration of his second 10-day contract. Two days later, he participated in NBA D-League All-Star Game.

Charlotte Hornets (2017–2018)
On February 24, 2017, O'Bryant signed a 10-day contract with the Charlotte Hornets. On March 4, 2017, he scored a career-high 15 points in a 112–102 win over the Denver Nuggets. Two days later, he signed a second 10-day contract with the Hornets. On March 16, 2017, he signed a multi-year contract with the Hornets.

On February 7, 2018, O'Bryant, along with two future second-round draft picks (2020 and 2021), was traded to the New York Knicks in exchange for Willy Hernangómez. He was waived by the Knicks the next day.

Maccabi Tel Aviv (2018–2019)

On July 31, 2018, O'Bryant signed a one-year deal with the Israeli team Maccabi Tel Aviv of the EuroLeague. On December 27, 2018, O'Bryant recorded a career-high 32 points, shooting 5-of-7 from 3-point range, along with five rebounds, three assists and three steals for 44 PIR, leading Maccabi to a 94–92 win over Olimpia Milano. Two days later, he was named EuroLeague Round 15 MVP. O'Bryant went on to win the 2019 Israeli League Championship with Maccabi.

Lokomotiv Kuban (2019–2020)
On August 14, 2019, O'Bryant signed with Lokomotiv Kuban of the VTB United League. He averaged 16.4 points, 5.7 rebounds, and 2.6 assists per game in VTB play. O'Bryant re-signed with the team on July 21, 2020. However, on September 18, he parted ways with the team due to a family issue.

Crvena zvezda (2020–2021)
On October 19, 2020, O'Bryant signed with Crvena Zvezda of the Adriatic League and the EuroLeague. On January 27, 2021, he received a 10-day suspension from the club due to a conflict with team head coach Dejan Radonjić during a game against Anadolu Efes. On February 21, the Zvezda parted ways with O'Bryant.

Türk Telekom (2021)
On February 21, 2021, O'Bryant signed with Türk Telekom of the Turkish Basketball Super League, for the remainder of the season.

On September 29, 2021, the Milwaukee Bucks signed O'Bryant to a training camp deal. He did not make the final roster however, and was waived on October 11.

Wonju DB Promy (2021–2022)
On November 14, 2021, O'Bryant signed with Wonju DB Promy of the Korean Basketball League. He averaged 10.4 points and 7.1 rebounds per game.

Meralco Bolts (2022)
On August 6, 2022, he signed with the Meralco Bolts of the Philippine Basketball Association (PBA) as the team's import for the 2022–23 PBA Commissioner's Cup. He was set to be replaced by Jessie Govan after a 1–5 start to the conference, but O'Bryant stayed with the team when Govan was measured above the conference's 6'10" height limit. He was supposed to play another game on October 30, but the game was postponed due to Tropical Storm Paeng. On October 31, he was finally replaced by K. J. McDaniels.

Shanghai Sharks (2022–present)
In October 2022, O'Bryant signed with the Shanghai Sharks of the Chinese Basketball Association.

Career statistics

NBA

Regular season

|-
| style="text-align:left;"|
| style="text-align:left;"|Milwaukee
| 34 || 15 || 10.8 || .367 ||  || .444 || 1.9 || .5 || .1 || .1 || 2.9
|-
| style="text-align:left;"|
| style="text-align:left;"|Milwaukee
| 66 || 4 || 13.0 || .411 || 1.000 || .675 || 2.7 || .5 || .3 || .1 || 3.0
|- 
| style="text-align:left;"|
| style="text-align:left;"|Denver
| 7 || 0 || 6.6 || .467 || .667 || 1.000 || 1.6 || .3 || .0 || .1 || 2.9
|-
| style="text-align:left;"|
| style="text-align:left;"|Charlotte
| 4 || 0 || 8.5 || .533 || .333 || .500 || 2.0 || 1.0 || .0 || .0 || 4.5
|-
| style="text-align:left;"|
| style="text-align:left;"|Charlotte
| 36 || 0 || 10.5 || .398 || .326 || .840 || 2.6 || .4 || .3 || .2 || 4.8
|- class="sortbottom"
| style="text-align:center;" colspan="2"|Career
| 147 || 19 || 11.5 || .402 || .360 || .663 || 2.4 || .5 || .2 || .1 || 3.5

Playoffs

|-
| style="text-align:left;"|2015
| style="text-align:left;"|Milwaukee
| 1 || 0 || 12.0 || .375 ||  ||  || 3.0 || .0 || .0 || .0 || 6.0
|- class="sortbottom"
| style="text-align:center;" colspan="2"|Career
| 1 || 0 || 12.0 || .375 ||  ||  || 3.0 || .0 || .0 || .0 || 6.0

EuroLeague

|-
| style="text-align:left;"|2018–19
| style="text-align:left;"|Maccabi
| 30 || 28 || 23.4 || .392 || .306 || .786 || 5.9 || 1.3 || .5 || .3 || 10.6 || 9.8
|- class="sortbottom"
| style="text-align:center;" colspan="2"|Career
| 30 || 28 || 23.4 || .392 || .306 || .786 || 5.9 || 1.3 || .5 || .3 || 10.6 || 9.8

Eurocup

|-
| style="text-align:left;"|2019–20
| style="text-align:left;"|Lokomotiv Kuban
| 10 || 9 || 26.0 || .448 || .345 || .724 || 5.1 || 1.4 || .4 || .5 || 13.8 || 10.6

References

External links

 LSU Tigers bio

1993 births
Living people
21st-century African-American sportspeople
ABA League players
African-American basketball players
American expatriate basketball people in China
American expatriate basketball people in Israel
American expatriate basketball people in the Philippines
American expatriate basketball people in Russia
American expatriate basketball people in Serbia
American expatriate basketball people in South Korea
American expatriate basketball people in Turkey
American men's basketball players
Basketball players from Mississippi
Centers (basketball)
Charlotte Hornets players
Denver Nuggets players
KK Crvena zvezda players
LSU Tigers basketball players
Maccabi Tel Aviv B.C. players
McDonald's High School All-Americans
Meralco Bolts players
Milwaukee Bucks draft picks
Milwaukee Bucks players
Northern Arizona Suns players
Parade High School All-Americans (boys' basketball)
PBC Lokomotiv-Kuban players
People from Cleveland, Mississippi
Philippine Basketball Association imports
Power forwards (basketball)
Shanghai Sharks players
Türk Telekom B.K. players
Wonju DB Promy players